Fumino (written: 文乃 or ふみの in hiragana) is a feminine Japanese given name. Notable people with the name include:

, Japanese manga artist
, Japanese actress

Fictional characters
, a character in the manga series We Never Learn
, a character in the light novel series Mayoi Neko Overrun!
, a character in the manga series High School Girls

Japanese feminine given names